Rani Pulomaja Devi (born 1967) was an Indian Lyricist in Telugu cinema. She was the only lady in India to write nearly 800 songs which includes with  devotional, folk, patriotic and film songs. She won the Best lyricst award for 2012 & 2015 from Bharatamuni arts academy. She honored with Doctorate from University of California, Berkeley for her unbelievable contribution for Telugu cinema in 2015. She established a world record as a professional lady lyric writer for more than 50 movies in a short period. which was recorded in Guinness book of World records, Wonder book of world records & Telugu book of world records.

Early life

Rani Pulomaja Devi was born to Rama Subramanya sarma and Lalita devi in Bitragunta, in Nellore District, Andhra pradesh. Her father was a Telugu pandit.

Education

Rani Pulomaja Devi completed her schooling in Anumasamudrampeta, Nellore district, and high school and degree completed in Arts college Jammalamadugu in Kadapa district, Andhra Pradesh. Music interested her, so she did her Flute diploma in Carnatic music.

Job

Rani Pulomaja Devi joined in State Employment Exchange office in 1987 as a junior assistant. She was promoted to senior assistant in 1997 to 2012. Later she became Junior Employment Officer, Tirupati and Chittor, staying for the rest of her life.

Working with Akashvani (radio broadcaster)

Rani Pulomaja Devi conducted somany literature programs in Akshavani, kadapa. She wrote many light music songs and performed some Carnatic music flute concerts.

Personal life

Rani Pulomaja Devi married Arjun (music director) in 1990 and has two sons Praddyottan and Druhin.

Multifaceted Personality

Rani Pulomaja Devi was multifaceted. She was a Green belt in Karate and made many arts like chalk carving, Wooden caving, rice art, clay molding and sculpting. She was very good in oil and water painting, did many pencil drawings. She wrote some short stories and poems in Telugu. They were published in all leading regional magazines and brought her stories together in a book named Dr. Rani Pulomaja Devi Kathalu.

Career

After marriage with Music director Arjun, she associated with him. They made nearly 600 albums in the devotional, folk, and patriotic genres. Later they started to work for films. Her debut film is Naa Mogudu Chiranjeevi. She became popular for her first English duet song in Telugu film industry film Posani Gentleman in 2009, then she won the Bharatamuni award for the film Seenugadu in 2011 for "Taali vodi tolibadi" song and got very good response from both critics and audiences. She wrote songs for Jaadugallu film in 2011 a dubbed film for Kannada film "Lavakusa" in top music director in Kannada "Gurukiran". In 2014 Rani Pulomaja Devi had another opportunity to write for her elder son Praddyottan's debut music direction. Another good chance for Rani Pulomaja Devi was the film "Dhanaa Dhan". She wrote single for this film in south India's top music director S.S. Thaman. Later, she received a big response for her lyrics in the film "Parampara". She won the Best Critics award in Indonesia film festival. It's a half beat film with good starcast by Naresh, Aamani, Raavi Kondala Rao, etc. For this film she again won the Bharatamuni award in 2015 Best critics lyrics writer.

In her film career she wrote 90% single cards.

Death

Rani Pulomaja Devi died on 16 September 2015. She was admitted Apollo Hospitals, Hyderabad in Advanced Critical Care Unit with kidney failure, severe sepsis which led to cardiac arrest. She also had diabetes.

Filmography

External links
 http://ranipulomajadevi.blogspot.in/
 http://doregamasongspk.com/doshi-2008-audio-songs-and-doshi-2008-mp3-songs-free-download/
 http://musicdirectorarjun.blogspot.in/2012/11/premato-nuvvastavani-sivangi-audio.html
 http://atozmp3.info/tag/telugu/page/173/
 http://ranipulomajadevi.blogspot.in/2013/01/our-songs.html
 http://ranipulomajadevi.blogspot.in/2012/12/neeve-nenai-rani-pulomajadevi-arjun.html
 http://ranipulomajadevi.blogspot.in/2012/08/janani-janma-bhumischa.html
 http://ranipulomajadevi.blogspot.in/2011/07/police-adhikari-movie-songs-adhikari.html

1967 births
2015 deaths
Telugu-language lyricists